Vladimir Mikhailovich Despotuli (Kerch 1885 - Rhineland 1977) was the publisher of Novoye Slovo, a Russian language newspaper in Germany.

He was born to a family of Russian Greeks.

During World War I, he served as adjutant lieutenant under general Nikolai Baratov taking part in the Russian expeditionary force in the Persian campaign. He also served as commander of Tehran for a period of time. After the Bolsheviks prevailed, he settled in Germany.

In Germany he worked as a journalist, initially as editor and then as publisher of the Russian-language newspaper Novoye Slovo (New Word). After 1934, the newspaper became the only Russian-language newspaper in Germany. Novoye Slovo was funded by the Nazi party's foreign affairs office and featured anti-Semitic and anti-Soviet articles; after the Molotov–Ribbentrop Pact it also published articles against the Allied Forces.

He was arrested by the Gestapo in 1943 under suspicion of dealings with English spy networks. After interrogating him, the Gestapo placed him under house arrest. After the defeat of the Germans, he was arrested by the Red Army and sent to a Gulag prison for 11 years. Following his release, he lived in Germany until his death in 1977.

External links 
 Archives of newspaper Novoye Slovo from National Library of Russia.
 Archives of newspaper Novoye Slovo from Berlin State Library.

References

1885 births
1977 deaths
Russian people of Greek descent
Russian military personnel of World War I
Counter-revolutionaries
Russian military leaders
Russian collaborators with Nazi Germany
Russian Liberation Army personnel
Russian anti-communists
Emigrants from the Russian Empire to Germany
White Russian emigrants to Germany
Nazi propagandists